is a 2018 Japanese television anime television series produced by OLM. Part of the Inazuma Eleven franchise. A sequel Inazuma Eleven: Orion no Kokuin started airing on October 5, 2018. An English dub of the series produced by SDI Media began airing on Disney XD on April 13, 2019, replacing Yo-kai Watch, another anime based on a Level-5 video game series by the same dubbing company. This is the third Inazuma Eleven series to receive an English dub after the original series and Inazuma Eleven GO.

Plot summary
Ares depicts an alternative canon following the events of the first season of the original Inazuma Eleven anime
after their victory in the Football Frontier, with the alien attack from the second season never occurring. When Japanese soccer has been deemed weak compared to international competition, the Raimon Eleven disband with its members transferring into different soccer teams across the country to strengthen Japan's soccer at a national level. Furthermore, sponsorship has become a vital aspect in a Japanese youth soccer team's survival, as it prevents a team's disbandment, while being essential to partake in matches.

The series focuses on the forward Asuto Inamori and his team, Inakuni Raimon, which is made up of players from the remote Inakunijima Island. Needing to maintain their club, they have replaced the original Raimon Eleven as Raimon Junior High's soccer team and compete as underdogs in the annual Football Frontier youth tournament.

Cast

Music
 Opening: "To the Top" by pugcat's
 Ending: "A Girl in Love is a Sign of Rain" by alom

Episode list

Home media
The first eight episodes were released on DVD in North America from NCircle Entertainment on February 4, 2020.

References

External links
 Inazuma Eleven Series (meta series official site) 
 Inazuma World 
 TV Tokyo Inazuma Eleven: Ares site 
 
Inazuma Eleven Ares (US official site) 

2018 anime television series debuts
Anime television series based on video games
Association football in anime and manga
Inazuma Eleven (anime)
Anime spin-offs
OLM, Inc.
Science fiction anime and manga
TV Tokyo original programming